Stony Houghton is a hamlet near Glapwell, part of the parish of Pleasley in Derbyshire, England, close to New Houghton. It is a very quiet area consisting of only a few residential properties amidst farmland and farmsteads, retaining a peaceful environment with attractive scenery and landscape.

The roads are quiet with no pedestrian footways. Horse riders are known to use the roads so drivers need to exercise caution.

The building pictured has now been sympathetically restored and modernised, maintaining the traditional rural setting of previous years.

Some of the properties around Stoney Houghton are Chatsworth Estate tied cottages, which are rented out to tenants who may be related to previous estate workers who have traditionally rented over the past years.

One bus route travels through the village run by Stagecoach in Mansfield.

Scarcliffe Woods are nearby, offering easy access to walking amenities.

References

External links

Bolsover District
Hamlets in Derbyshire